The Kuwait Pro Cycling Team is a Kuwaiti UCI Continental cycling team founded in 2021.

Team roster

References

External links

UCI Continental Teams (Asia)
Cycling teams based in Kuwait
Cycling teams established in 2021